Jonathan Spéville (born 26 January 1991) is a Mauritian professional footballer who plays as a defender for Mauritian Premier League club Roche-Bois Bolton City and the Mauritius national team.

References 

1991 births
Living people
People from Rodrigues
Mauritian footballers
Association football defenders
Roche-Bois Bolton City YC players
Mauritius international footballers